Die Supernasen is a 1983 West German comedy film featuring Thomas Gottschalk and Mike Krüger. The name of the movie, "The Supernoses", refers to both having big noses.

The two have worked together in four popular movies, regarded as the Supernasen-series. They were mostly college movies in a German setting - two naughty young men in Bavaria, with beautiful girls and funny complications. Their current popularity keeps their old films alive, like this film, Die Supernasen. Other collaborations are
 Piratensender Powerplay
 Zwei Nasen tanken Super
 Die Einsteiger

Plot 
Tommy and Mike, again without a job and without money, decide deliberately to open the PI agency "Columbo" and work as private investigators. Their first case involves a rich man who wants to know if his wife is cheating, which leads them to Bad Spänzer. Here, they slip into a variety of roles, save their client's marriage, thwart the assassination attempt on a sheik and fall in love with two young women.

Reception 
The film was a huge commercial success, drawing a crowd of 2.7 million in Germany, which made it the most successful German-language movie in 1983 and sixth-most-successful movie in Germany that year.

The film was popular in the German-speaking region and in several Eastern European countries. In Czechoslovakia it was released under the name "Dva supernosáči".

Releases 
On February 1, 2019, a remastered Blu-ray was released, featuring the original soundtrack that was not included in previous DVD releases.

References

External links 
 Home || diesupernasen.de - Die Supernasen-Fan-Seite - German Fansite
 

1983 films
1980s buddy comedy films
German comedy films
1980s German-language films
West German films
1983 comedy films
Films scored by Gerhard Heinz
1980s German films